Panthiades aeolus is a butterfly in the family Lycaenidae. It was described by Johan Christian Fabricius in 1775. It is found in Guyana, Suriname, Brazil, Ecuador and Trinidad.

References

Butterflies described in 1775
Eumaeini
Lycaenidae of South America
Taxa named by Johan Christian Fabricius